KRAT or Krat may refer to:

 3036 Krat, an outer main belt asteroid
 Krasnoyarsk Time, the official time zone for central and east Siberia
 KRAT (Oregon), a defunct radio station (97.7 FM) formerly licensed to serve Altamont, Oregon, United States
 KRAT (FM), a radio station (92.1 FM) licensed to serve Sparks, Nevada, United States
 Krat Rocks, an area of submerged rocks near Antarctica
 Krat (1999), a novel by Danish author Christian Jungersen (born 1962)
 Nick Krat (born 1943), Ukrainian-American soccer player

See also
 13000krát, 1 2007 album by Slovak singer Misha (Michaela Paľová)